Padiet Wang (born January 13, 1998) is a South Sudanese-American professional basketball player who currently plays for the Surrey Scorchers. He also plays for the South Sudan national team.

Early life 
Wang was born in Beirut, Lebanon, to South Sudanese parents. Around age 2, his family moved to the United States, settling in the state of Colorado. There, Wang picked up basketball in elementary school and started playing competitively in middle school. Growing up, he went to Denver Nuggets games.

Wang played for Overland High School and was a two-time Colorado 5A state champion. After graduating high school, he joined the University of Colorado Colorado Springs's basketball team in 2016.

Professional career 
In June 2020, amidst the COVID-19 pandemic, Wang signed for German club Bayer Giants Leverkusen of the ProA, the national second division.

Wang started his professional career in Portugal, playing for Académica Coimbra in the Liga Portuguesa de Basquetebol (LPB). He averaged 14.8 points for the team.

In April 2022, Wang played for Cobra Sport in the 2022 BAL season, the second season of the Basketball Africa League. He averaged 15.4 points (second on the team) and led Cobra in assists with 7 per game.

On August 11, 2022, Wang signed a one-year contract with the Surrey Scorchers of the British Basketball League (BBL).

National team career 
Wang represents the South Sudan men's national basketball team in international competitions. He played during the 2023 World Cup qualifiers and helped South Sudan qualify for their first-ever World Cup.

References 

1998 births
Living people
South Sudanese men's basketball players
American men's basketball players

Surrey Scorchers players
Cobra Sport players
Point guards
Shooting guards